The 2009–10 Football League Two was AFC Bournemouth's second consecutive season in League Two. Bournemouth finished second in the table and gained promotion to League One.

Competitions

Football League Two

League table

Results per matchday

Results

League Cup

FA Cup

Football League Trophy

Squad statistics 
Appearances for competitive matches only

See also 
 2009–10 in English football
 A.F.C. Bournemouth

External links 
 A.F.C. Bournemouth official website
 A.F.C. Bournemouth 2009–10 season players stats at Soccerbase

AFC Bournemouth
AFC Bournemouth seasons